George Maryan (born 23 March 1963) is an Indian actor and comedian, who has appeared in Tamil cinema. He started his career in theatre, before working in Tamil cinema and has often collaborated with film-makers A. L. Vijay, Sundar C and Priyadarshan.

Career
George Maryan began his career as an actor in theatre during 1989 and continued to perform in plays until 2002. Thereafter, he moved on to work in Tamil cinema, often portraying supporting and comedy roles. George made a breakthrough as an actor in Tamil films after being cast as a bumbling police officer in Priyadarshan's Kanchivaram (2008), where he was selected by the casting director A. L. Vijay, who was impressed by George's work in theatre. 

Vijay then cast George in his own venture Poi Solla Porom (2008), before giving him progressively larger roles in Madrasapattinam (2010) as an English teacher and in Deiva Thirumagal (2011) as an intellectually disabled person. His role as a house servant in A. L. Vijay's Saivam (2014), also won him critical acclaim, with a reviewer from The Times of India stating George was "well-cast". The review from Behindwoods.com noted George's "expressions are topnotch", while Saraswathi of Rediff praised his "impeccable comic timing". Likewise, the reviewer from the Deccan Chronicle also noted he "shines with his natural feat", while Baradwaj Rangan of The Hindu also praised his performance. Furthermore, the reviewer from Indiaglitz.com also stated "George as the servant, and Malathi who plays his wife and the servant maid, in the house steal the show with their comic timing and also perform in the only emotional scenes without any mistake". George has also collaborated with Sundar C three times, in Aambala and as a part of the Kalakalappu franchise. He then received critical acclaim for his role in Kaithi (2019) as a constable.

Selected filmography

Azhagi (2002)
Samurai (2002)
Solla Marandha Kadhai (2002)
Jay Jay (2003)
Sandakozhi(2005) As lawyer
Poi Solla Porom (2008)
Jayamkondaan (2008)
Kanchivaram (2008)
Kadhalagi (2010)
Madrasapattinam (2010)
Sankarankovil (2011)
Deiva Thirumagal (2011)
 Velayudham (2011)
Mouna Guru (2011)
Kalakalappu (2012) as Constable Pachchai Perumal 
Theeya Velai Seiyyanum Kumaru (2013)
Bramman (2014)
Saivam (2014) as Raja
Kaadu (2014)
Appuchi Gramam (2014)
Kaaviya Thalaivan (2014)
Aambala (2015) as Santhanam's Assistant Constable
Sandamarutham (2015)
Ivanuku Thannila Gandam (2015)
Agathinai (2015)
Komban (2015)
Sakalakala Vallavan (2015)
Paayum Puli (2015)
Oru Oorla Rendu Raja (2015)
Pasanga 2 (2015)
Aarathu Sinam (2016)
Jithan 2 (2016)
Saravanan Irukka Bayamaen (2016)
Kuttrame Thandanai (2016)
Aandavan Kattalai (2016)
Ammani (2016)
Virumandikum Sivanandikum (2016)
Kanavu Variyam (2017)
Oru Kidayin Karunai Manu (2017)
Spyder (2017)
Nimir (2018)
Kalakalappu 2 (2018)
Lakshmi (2018)
Viswasam (2019)
Thadam (2019)
Sindhubaadh (2019)
Mei (2019)
Bigil (2019)
Kaithi  (2019) as Napoleon
Pizhai (2020)
Thoonga Kangal (2020)
Mandela (2021)
Annabelle Sethupathi (2021)
Naduvan (2021)
Annaatthe (2021)
Enemy (2021)
Theerpugal Virkapadum (2021)
Naai Sekar (2022)
Veeramae Vaagai Soodum (2022)
Sebastian P.C. 524 (2022; Telugu)
Achcham Madam Naanam Payirppu (2022)
Visithiran (2022)
Don (2022) as George Matthews
Ayngaran (2022)
Veetla Vishesham (2022) as Doctor
Kichi Kichi (2022)
Gulu Gulu (2022)
Battery (2022)
Kooman (2022)
Run Baby Run (2023)
Leo – Bloody Sweet (2023)
Indian 2 (2023)

Web series

Awards and nominations

References

External links
 

Indian male television actors
Tamil male actors
Living people
Male actors from Chennai
21st-century Indian male actors
Tamil comedians
Male actors in Tamil cinema
1963 births